Agriomelissa aethiopica is a moth of the family Sesiidae. It is known from Ethiopia.

References

Endemic fauna of Ethiopia
Sesiidae
Insects of Ethiopia
Moths of Africa
Moths described in 1917